The Polish Athletics Championships is an annual outdoor track and field competition organised by the Polish Athletic Association (PZLA), which serves as the Polish national championship for the sport. It is typically held as a three-day event in the Polish summer, ranging from late June to early August. The venue of the championships changes annually. The first men's champions were declared in 1919 and the first women's champions followed in 1922. Champions are typically Polish nationals, though some foreign athletes have won at the event as invited guests, in particular at the 1972 championships.

Men

100 metres
1960: Marian Foik
1961: Marian Foik
1962: Andrzej Zieliński
1963: Jerzy Juskowiak
1964: Marian Foik
1965: Wiesław Maniak
1966: Wiesław Maniak
1967: Wiesław Maniak
1968: Marian Dudziak
1969: Zenon Nowosz
1970: Zenon Nowosz
1971: Wiesław Maniak
1972: 
1973: Zenon Nowosz
1974: Andrzej Świerczyński
1975: Andrzej Świerczyński
1976: Zenon Licznerski
1977: Zenon Licznerski
1978: Marian Woronin
1979: Marian Woronin
1980: Marian Woronin
1981: Marian Woronin
1982: Marian Woronin
1983: Marian Woronin
1984: Leszek Dunecki
1985: Marian Woronin
1986: Czesław Prądzyński
1987: Czesław Prądzyński
1988: Marian Woronin
1989: Jacek Marlicki
1990: Jacek Marlicki
1991: Jarosław Kaniecki
1992: Marek Zalewski
1993: Marek Zalewski
1994: Marek Zalewski
1995: Marek Zalewski
1996: Ryszard Pilarczyk
1997: Ryszard Pilarczyk
1998: Marcin Krzywański
1999: Piotr Balcerzak
2000: Marcin Nowak
2001: Marcin Krzywański
2002: Marcin Urbaś
2003: Marcin Jędrusiński
2004: Łukasz Chyła
2005: Michał Bielczyk
2006: Dariusz Kuć

200 metres
1960: Jan Jarzembowski
1961: Marian Foik
1962: Andrzej Zieliński
1963: Marian Foik
1964: Marian Foik
1965: Wiesław Maniak
1966: Marian Dudziak
1967: Jan Werner
1968: Edward Romanowski
1969: Jan Werner
1970: Zenon Nowosz
1971: Jan Werner
1972: Jerzy Czerbniak
1973: Marek Bedyński
1974: Marek Bedyński
1975: Bogdan Grzejszczak
1976: Zenon Licznerski
1977: Zenon Licznerski
1978: Leszek Dunecki
1979: Leszek Dunecki
1980: Leszek Dunecki
1981: Leszek Dunecki
1982: Czesław Prądzyński
1983: Marian Woronin
1984: Leszek Dunecki
1985: Czesław Prądzyński
1986: Czesław Prądzyński
1987: Czesław Prądzyński
1988: Czesław Prądzyński
1989: Marek Zalewski
1990: Marek Zalewski
1991: Jarosław Kaniecki
1992: Marek Zalewski
1993: Marek Zalewski
1994: Marek Zalewski
1995: Robert Maćkowiak
1996: Robert Maćkowiak
1997: Robert Maćkowiak
1998: Marcin Urbaś
1999: Marcin Urbaś
2000: Marcin Urbaś
2001: Marcin Urbaś
2002: Marcin Jędrusiński
2003: Marcin Jędrusiński
2004: Marcin Urbaś
2005: Marcin Jędrusiński
2006: Marcin Jędrusiński

400 metres
1960: Jerzy Kowalski
1961: Jerzy Kowalski
1962: Andrzej Badeński
1963: Andrzej Badeński
1964: Andrzej Badeński
1965: Andrzej Badeński
1966: Stanisław Grędziński
1967: Andrzej Badeński
1968: Jan Werner
1969: Stanisław Grędziński
1970: Jan Werner
1971: Jan Werner
1972: Zbigniew Jaremski
1973: Zbigniew Jaremski
1974: Roman Siedlecki
1975: Zbigniew Jaremski
1976: Jan Werner
1977: Ryszard Podlas
1978: Ryszard Podlas
1979: Ryszard Podlas
1980: Adam Starostka
1981: Andrzej Stępień
1982: Andrzej Stępień
1983: Andrzej Stępień
1984: Andrzej Stępień
1985: Andrzej Stępień
1986: Andrzej Stępień
1987: Marek Sira
1988: Tomasz Jędrusik
1989: Wojciech Lach
1990: Tomasz Jędrusik
1991: Wojciech Lach
1992: Tomasz Czubak
1993: Tomasz Czubak
1994: Tomasz Czubak
1995: Tomasz Jędrusik
1996: Piotr Rysiukiewicz
1997: Tomasz Czubak
1998: Robert Maćkowiak
1999: Piotr Rysiukiewicz
2000: Robert Maćkowiak
2001: Robert Maćkowiak
2002: Piotr Rysiukiewicz
2003: Rafał Wieruszewski
2004: Marcin Marciniszyn
2005: Marcin Marciniszyn
2006: Marcin Marciniszyn

800 metres
1960: Jerzy Bruszkowski
1961: Witold Baran
1962: Jerzy Bruszkowski
1963: Henryk Maciąg
1964: Jerzy Bruszkowski
1965: Janusz Grzeszczuk
1966: Henryk Szordykowski
1967: Henryk Szordykowski
1968: Jerzy Sawicki
1969: Henryk Szordykowski
1970: Stanisław Waśkiewicz
1971: Andrzej Kupczyk
1972: Stanisław Waśkiewicz
1973: Andrzej Kupczyk
1974: Ryszard Świniarski
1975: Waldemar Gondek
1976: Marian Gęsicki
1977: Marian Gęsicki
1978: Marian Gęsicki
1979: Stanisław Rzeźniczak
1980: Marian Gęsicki
1981: Bogdan Stroka
1982: Ryszard Ostrowski
1983: Ryszard Ostrowski
1984: Ryszard Ostrowski
1985: Piotr Piekarski
1986: Rafał Jerzy
1987: Ryszard Ostrowski
1988: Piotr Piekarski
1989: Piotr Piekarski
1990: Piotr Piekarski
1991: Piotr Piekarski
1992: Andrzej Jakubiec
1993: Piotr Piekarski
1994: Piotr Piekarski
1995: Piotr Piekarski
1996: Wojciech Kałdowski
1997: Grzegorz Krzosek
1998: Paweł Czapiewski
1999: Wojciech Kałdowski
2000: Grzegorz Krzosek
2001: Paweł Czapiewski
2002: Grzegorz Krzosek
2003: Mirosław Formela
2004: Mirosław Formela
2005: Paweł Czapiewski
2006: Grzegorz Krzosek

1500 metres
1960: Zbigniew Orywał
1961: Zbigniew Orywał
1962: Witold Baran
1963: Witold Baran
1964: Witold Baran
1965: Bolesław Kowalczyk
1966: Witold Baran
1967: Witold Baran
1968: Henryk Szordykowski
1969: Jerzy Maluśki
1970: Andrzej Kupczyk
1971: Henryk Szordykowski
1972: Henryk Szordykowski
1973: Lesław Zając
1974: Henryk Szordykowski
1975: Henryk Wasilewski
1976: Henryk Wasilewski
1977: Henryk Wasilewski
1978: Henryk Wasilewski
1979: Jerzy Kalicki
1980: Włodzimierz Matosz
1981: Mirosław Żerkowski
1982: Mirosław Żerkowski
1983: Mirosław Żerkowski
1984: Mirosław Żerkowski
1985: Mirosław Żerkowski
1986: Waldemar Lisicki
1987: Piotr Kurek
1988: Waldemar Lisicki
1989: Waldemar Lisicki
1990: Krzysztof Filusz
1991: Waldemar Glinka
1992: Karol Dudij
1993: Andrzej Jakubiec
1994: Piotr Kitliński
1995: Piotr Rostkowski
1996: Jakub Fijalkowski
1997: Piotr Rostkowski
1998: Jakub Fijalkowski
1999: Leszek Zblewski
2000: Leszek Zblewski
2001: Leszek Zblewski
2002: Paweł Czapiewski
2003: Zbigniew Graczyk
2004: Zbigniew Graczyk
2005: Mirosław Formela
2006: Mirosław Formela

5000 metres
1960: Kazimierz Zimny
1961: Lech Boguszewicz
1962: Jerzy Mathias
1963: Lech Boguszewicz
1964: Lech Boguszewicz
1965: Kazimierz Zimny
1966: Kazimierz Zimny
1967: Roland Brehmer
1968: Witold Baran
1969: Kazimierz Podolak
1970: Kazimierz Podolak
1971: Edward Łęgowski
1972: Bronisław Malinowski
1973: Bronisław Malinowski
1974: 
1975: Bronisław Malinowski
1976: Jerzy Kowol
1977: Jerzy Kowol
1978: Jerzy Kowol
1979: Jerzy Kowol
1980: Ryszard Kopijasz
1981: Bogusław Psujek
1982: Bogusław Psujek
1983: Bogusław Mamiński
1984: Antoni Niemczak
1985: Wojciech Jaworski & Bogusław Psujek
1986: Bogusław Psujek
1987: Bogusław Mamiński
1988: Czesław Mojżysz
1989: Leszek Bebło
1990: Henryk Jankowski
1991: Michał Bartoszak
1992: Michał Bartoszak
1993: Michał Bartoszak
1994: Sławomir Kąpiński
1995: Jan Bialk
1996: Waldemar Glinka
1997: Michał Bartoszak
1998: Piotr Gładki
1999: Piotr Gładki
2000: Piotr Drwal
2001: Leszek Biegała
2002: Dariusz Kruczkowski
2003: Radosław Popławski
2004: Michał Kaczmarek
2005: Radosław Popławski
2006: Michał Kaczmarek

10,000 metres
1960: Zdzisław Krzyszkowiak
1961: Stanisław Ożóg
1962: Stanisław Ożóg
1963: Edward Owczarek
1964: Kazimierz Podolak
1965: Edward Owczarek
1966: Edward Stawiarz
1967: Mieczysław Korzec
1968: Edward Stawiarz
1969: Edward Stawiarz
1970: Edward Mleczko
1971: Edward Mleczko
1972: Kazimierz Podolak
1973: Henryk Piotrowski
1974: Henryk Nogala
1975: Edward Mleczko
1976: Ryszard Kopijasz
1977: Ryszard Kopijasz
1978: Andrzej Jarosiewicz
1979: Jerzy Kowol
1980: Ryszard Kopijasz
1981: Bogumil Kus
1982: Bogumil Kus
1983: Bogumil Kus
1984: Antoni Niemczak
1985: Antoni Niemczak
1986: Bogusław Psujek
1987: Jan Huruk
1988: Jan Marchewka
1989: Leszek Bebło
1990: Sławomir Majusiak
1991: Leszek Bebło
1992: Grzegorz Gajdus
1993: Zbigniew Nadolski
1994: Grzegorz Gajdus
1995: Jan Bialk
1996: Waldemar Glinka
1997: Jan Bialk
1998: Krzysztof Bałdyga
1999: Jan Bialk
2000: Jan Bialk
2001: Dariusz Kruczkowski
2002: Dariusz Kruczkowski
2003: Dariusz Kruczkowski
2004: Jan Zakrzewski
2005: Arkadiusz Sowa
2006: Michał Kaczmarek

20K run
1975: Zbigniew Sawicki
1976: Zbigniew Sawicki
1977: Andrzej Jarosiewicz
1978: Zbigniew Pierzynka
1979: Not held
1980: Andrzej Jarosiewicz
1981: Ryszard Kopijasz
1982: Antoni Niemczak
1983: Paweł Lorens
1984: Paweł Lorens
1985: Paweł Lorens
1986: Wiktor Sawicki
1987: Mirosław Gołębiewski
1988: Mirosław Gołębiewski
1989: Wiesław Perszke
1990: Leszek Bebło
1991: Grzegorz Gajdus

25K run
1979: Zbigniew Pierzynka

Marathon
The course for the 1992 marathon race was short, but the winner remained valid.
1960: Euzebiusz Fert
1961: Albin Czech
1962: Jerzy Morawiec
1963: Jacek Nowakowski
1964: Marian Jurczyński
1965: Marian Jurczyński
1966: Zdzisław Bogusz
1967: Edmund Klecha
1968: Zdzisław Bogusz
1969: Zdzisław Bogusz
1970: Zdzisław Bogusz
1971: Edward Stawiarz
1972: Edward Stawiarz
1973: Edward Stawiarz
1974: Edward Łęgowski
1975: Edward Łęgowski
1976: Kazimierz Orzeł
1977: Kazimierz Orzeł
1978: Ryszard Marczak
1979: Zbigniew Pierzynka
1980: Zbigniew Pierzynka
1981: Ryszard Marczak
1982: Ryszard Kopijasz
1983: Jerzy Kowol
1984: Wojciech Ratkowski
1985: Ryszard Misiewicz
1986: Antoni Niemczak
1987: Bogumil Kus
1988: Wiktor Sawicki
1989: Marek Deputat
1990: Józef Kazanecki
1991: Tadeusz Ławicki
1992: Tadeusz Ławicki
1993: Tadeusz Ławicki
1994: Janusz Wójcik
1995: Wiesław Palczyński
1996: Mirosław Plawgo
1997: Adam Szanowicz
1998: Wiesław Perszke
1999: Piotr Poblocki
2000: Mirosław Plawgo
2001: Mirosław Plawgo
2002: Jan Bialk
2003: Waldemar Glinka
2004: Waldemar Glinka
2005: Rafał Wójcik

3000 metres steeplechase
1960: Jerzy Chromik
1961: Jerzy Chromik
1962: Jerzy Chromik
1963: Edward Szklarczyk
1964: Edward Szklarczyk
1965: Edward Szklarczyk
1966: Edward Szklarczyk
1967: Wolfgang Luers
1968: Stanisław Śmitkowski
1969: Kazimierz Maranda
1970: Tadeusz Zieliński
1971: Kazimierz Maranda
1972: Stanisław Śmitkowski
1973: Bronisław Malinowski
1974: Bronisław Malinowski
1975: Henryk Lesiuk
1976: Kazimierz Maranda
1977: Kazimierz Maranda
1978: Bronisław Malinowski
1979: Bogusław Mamiński
1980: Bronisław Malinowski
1981: Krzysztof Wesołowski
1982: Piotr Zgarda
1983: Krzysztof Wesołowski
1984: Henryk Jankowski
1985: Bogusław Mamiński
1986: Henryk Jankowski
1987: Mirosław Żerkowski
1988: Mirosław Żerkowski
1989: Henryk Jankowski
1990: Tomasz Zimny
1991: Artur Osman
1992: Bogusław Mamiński
1993: Bogusław Mamiński
1994: Rafał Wójcik
1995: Rafał Wójcik
1996: Michał Bartoszak
1997: Rafał Wójcik
1998: Rafał Wójcik
1999: Jan Zakrzewski
2000: Rafał Wójcik
2001: Jan Zakrzewski
2002: Rafał Wójcik
2003: Rafał Wójcik
2004: Jan Zakrzewski
2005: Jakub Czaja
2006: Tomasz Szymkowiak

110 metres hurdles
1960: Roman Muzyk
1961: Roman Muzyk
1962: Edward Bugala
1963: Edward Bugala
1964: Edward Bugala
1965: Adam Kołodziejczyk
1966: Adam Kołodziejczyk
1967: Adam Kołodziejczyk
1968: Adam Kołodziejczyk
1969: Marek Jóźwik
1970: Marek Jóźwik
1971: Marek Jóźwik
1972: Leszek Wodzyński
1973: Leszek Wodzyński
1974: Mirosław Wodzyński
1975: Leszek Wodzyński
1976: Leszek Wodzyński
1977: Jan Pusty
1978: Romuald Giegiel
1979: Jan Pusty
1980: Jan Pusty
1981: Romuald Giegiel
1982: Romuald Giegiel
1983: Romuald Giegiel
1984: Romuald Giegiel
1985: Romuald Giegiel
1986: Romuald Giegiel
1987: Krzysztof Płatek
1988: Krzysztof Płatek
1989: Paweł Grzegorzewski
1990: Tomasz Nagórka
1991: Piotr Wójcik
1992: Piotr Wójcik
1993: Piotr Wójcik
1994: Ronald Mehlich
1995: Ronald Mehlich
1996: Krzysztof Mehlich
1997: Ronald Mehlich
1998: Tomasz Ścigaczewski
1999: Tomasz Ścigaczewski
2000: Marcin Kuszewski
2001: Artur Kohutek
2002: Artur Kohutek
2003: Artur Kohutek
2004: Tomasz Ścigaczewski
2005: Tomasz Ścigaczewski
2006: Artur Kohutek

200 metres hurdles
1960: Zdzisław Kumiszcze
1961: Zdzisław Kumiszcze
1962: Edward Bugala
1963: Bogusław Gierajewski

400 metres hurdles
1960: Wiesław Król
1961: Zdzisław Kumiszcze
1962: Andrzej Makowski
1963: Bogusław Gierajewski
1964: Bogusław Gierajewski
1965: Andrzej Skorupiński
1966: Stanisław Gubiec
1967: Stanisław Gubiec
1968: Wilhelm Weistand
1969: Tadeusz Kulczycki
1970: Zdzisław Serafin
1971: Tadeusz Kulczycki
1972: 
1973: Jerzy Hewelt
1974: Jerzy Hewelt
1975: Jerzy Hewelt
1976: Jerzy Hewelt
1977: Jerzy Hewelt
1978: Krzysztof Węglarski
1979: Leszek Rzepakowski
1980: Ryszard Szparak
1981: Ryszard Szparak
1982: Ryszard Szparak
1983: Ryszard Szparak
1984: Ryszard Szparak
1985: Ryszard Stoch
1986: Ryszard Stoch
1987: Ryszard Stoch
1988: Robert Zajkowski
1989: Ryszard Stoch
1990: Paweł Woźniak
1991: Paweł Woźniak
1992: Paweł Woźniak
1993: Piotr Kotlarski
1994: Piotr Kotlarski
1995: Paweł Januszewski
1996: Paweł Januszewski
1997: Paweł Januszewski
1998: Bartosz Gruman
1999: Paweł Januszewski
2000: Paweł Januszewski
2001: Marek Plawgo
2002: Paweł Januszewski
2003: Marek Plawgo
2004: Paweł Januszewski
2005: Marek Plawgo
2006: Marek Plawgo

High jump
1960: Piotr Sobotta
1961: Edward Czernik
1962: Piotr Sobotta
1963: Edward Czernik
1964: Edward Czernik
1965: Piotr Kaczmarek
1966: Edward Czernik
1967: Edward Czernik
1968: Janusz Białogrodzki
1969: Wojciech Gołębiewski
1970: Lech Klinger
1971: Wojciech Gołębiewski
1972: 
1973: Włodzimierz Perka
1974: Jacek Wszoła
1975: Jacek Wszoła
1976: Jacek Wszoła
1977: Jacek Wszoła
1978: Jacek Wszoła
1979: Jacek Wszoła
1980: Jacek Wszoła
1981: Janusz Trzepizur
1982: Jacek Wszoła
1983: Janusz Trzepizur
1984: Jacek Wszoła
1985: Jacek Wszoła
1986: Dariusz Zielke
1987: Krzysztof Krawczyk
1988: Jacek Wszoła
1989: Artur Partyka
1990: Artur Partyka
1991: Artur Partyka
1992: Artur Partyka
1993: Artur Partyka
1994: Artur Partyka
1995: Artur Partyka
1996: Artur Partyka
1997: Artur Partyka
1998: Artur Partyka
1999: Artur Partyka
2000: Artur Partyka
2001: Grzegorz Sposób
2002: Grzegorz Sposób
2003: Aleksander Waleriańczyk
2004: Robert Wolski
2005: Michał Bieniek
2006: Grzegorz Sposób

Pole vault
1960: Janusz Gronowski
1961: Janusz Gronowski
1962: Janusz Gronowski
1963: Włodzimierz Sokołowski
1964: Włodzimierz Sokołowski
1965: Włodzimierz Sokołowski
1966: Włodzimierz Sokołowski
1967: Waldemar Węcek
1968: Leszek Butscher
1969: Sławomir Nowak
1970: Wojciech Buciarski
1971: Włodzimierz Sokołowski
1972: Tadeusz Ślusarski
1973: Władysław Kozakiewicz
1974: Tadeusz Ślusarski
1975: Tadeusz Ślusarski
1976: Władysław Kozakiewicz
1977: Władysław Kozakiewicz
1978: Władysław Kozakiewicz
1979: Władysław Kozakiewicz
1980: Zbigniew Matyka
1981: Władysław Kozakiewicz
1982: Tadeusz Ślusarski
1983: Tadeusz Ślusarski
1984: Władysław Kozakiewicz
1985: Marian Kolasa
1986: Mariusz Klimczyk
1987: Marian Kolasa
1988: Ryszard Kolasa
1989: Ryszard Kolasa
1990: Mirosław Chmara
1991: Mirosław Chmara
1992: Mirosław Chmara
1993: Bogusław Kopkowski
1994: Krzysztof Kusiak
1995: Adam Kolasa
1996: Adam Kolasa
1997: Krzysztof Kusiak
1998: Krzysztof Kusiak
1999: Przemysław Gurin
2000: Krzysztof Kusiak
2001: Adam Kolasa
2002: Paweł Szczyrba
2003: Adam Kolasa
2004: Adam Kolasa
2005: Adam Kolasa
2006: Przemysław Czerwiński

Long jump
1960: Edward Ludwiczak
1961: Józef Szmidt
1962: Waldemar Gawron
1963: Andrzej Stalmach
1964: Andrzej Stalmach
1965: Jerzy Chlopek
1966: Andrzej Stalmach
1967: Andrzej Stalmach
1968: Andrzej Stalmach
1969: Waldemar Stępień
1970: Stanisław Cabaj
1971: Stanisław Szudrowicz
1972: Jerzy Homziuk
1973: Zbigniew Beta
1974: Stanisław Szudrowicz
1975: Grzegorz Cybulski
1976: Grzegorz Cybulski
1977: Andrzej Korniak
1978: Grzegorz Cybulski
1979: Grzegorz Cybulski
1980: Stanisław Jaskułka
1981: Stanisław Jaskułka
1982: Stanisław Jaskułka
1983: Włodzimierz Włodarczyk
1984: Stanisław Jaskułka
1985: Andrzej Klimaszewski
1986: Stanisław Jaskułka
1987: Andrzej Klimaszewski
1988: Mirosław Hydel
1989: Mirosław Hydel
1990: Dariusz Krakowiak
1991: Mirosław Nowaczyk
1992: Roman Golanowski
1993: Roman Golanowski
1994: Roman Golanowski
1995: Dariusz Bontruk
1996: Krzysztof Łuczak
1997: Krzysztof Łuczak
1998: Grzegorz Marciniszyn
1999: Tomasz Mateusiak
2000: Grzegorz Marciniszyn
2001: Grzegorz Marciniszyn
2002: Tomasz Mateusiak
2003: Tomasz Mateusiak
2004: Michał Łukasiak
2005: Tomasz Mateusiak
2006: Marcin Starzak

Triple jump
1960: Józef Szmidt
1961: Ryszard Malcherczyk
1962: Józef Szmidt
1963: Józef Szmidt
1964: Ryszard Malcherczyk
1965: Józef Szmidt
1966: Józef Szmidt
1967: Józef Szmidt
1968: Andrzej Puławski
1969: Józef Szmidt
1970: Józef Szmidt
1971: Józef Szmidt
1972: Michał Joachimowski
1973: Michał Joachimowski
1974: Michał Joachimowski
1975: Michał Joachimowski
1976: Michał Joachimowski
1977: Eugeniusz Biskupski
1978: Michał Joachimowski
1979: Eugeniusz Biskupski
1980: Zdzisław Sobora
1981: Zdzisław Hoffmann
1982: Stanisław Oporski
1983: Zdzisław Hoffmann
1984: Zdzisław Hoffmann
1985: Jacek Pastusiński
1986: Jacek Pastusiński
1987: Jacek Pastusiński
1988: Andrzej Grabarczyk
1989: Zdzisław Hoffmann
1990: Andrzej Grabarczyk
1991: Andrzej Grabarczyk
1992: Eugeniusz Bedeniczuk
1993: Jacek Butkiewicz
1994: Piotr Weremczuk
1995: Paweł Zdrajkowski
1996: Krystian Ciemala
1997: Krystian Ciemala
1998: Paweł Zdrajkowski
1999: Krzysztof Szuptarski
2000: Jacek Kazimierowski
2001: Jacek Kazimierowski
2002: Jacek Kazimierowski
2003: Robert Michniewski
2004: Jacek Kazimierowski
2005: Jacek Kazimierowski
2006: Jacek Kazimierowski

Shot put
1960: Alfred Sosgórnik
1961: Alfred Sosgórnik
1962: Alfred Sosgórnik
1963: Władysław Komar
1964: Władysław Komar
1965: Alfred Sosgórnik
1966: Władysław Komar
1967: Władysław Komar
1968: Władysław Komar
1969: Władysław Komar
1970: Władysław Komar
1971: Władysław Komar
1972: Władysław Komar
1973: Władysław Komar
1974: Mieczysław Bręczewski
1975: Władysław Komar
1976: Władysław Komar
1977: Władysław Komar
1978: Władysław Komar
1979: Edward Sarul
1980: Edward Sarul
1981: Janusz Gassowski
1982: Edward Sarul
1983: Edward Sarul
1984: Janusz Gassowski
1985: Janusz Gassowski
1986: Helmut Krieger
1987: Helmut Krieger
1988: Helmut Krieger
1989: Helmut Krieger
1990: Helmut Krieger
1991: Helmut Krieger
1992: Helmut Krieger
1993: Helmut Krieger
1994: Helmut Krieger
1995: Helmut Krieger
1996: Piotr Perżyło
1997: Przemysław Zabawski
1998: Piotr Perżyło
1999: Mirosław Dec
2000: Przemysław Zabawski
2001: Leszek Śliwa
2002: Tomasz Majewski
2003: Tomasz Majewski
2004: Tomasz Majewski
2005: Tomasz Majewski
2006: Dominik Zieliński

Discus throw
1960: Edmund Piątkowski
1961: Edmund Piątkowski
1962: Edmund Piątkowski
1963: Edmund Piątkowski
1964: Edmund Piątkowski
1965: Edmund Piątkowski
1966: Edmund Piątkowski
1967: Zenon Begier
1968: Edmund Piątkowski
1969: Edmund Piątkowski
1970: Zenon Begier
1971: Lech Gajdziński
1972: 
1973: Lech Gajdziński
1974: Lech Gajdziński
1975: Stanisław Wołodko
1976: Stanisław Wołodko
1977: Olgierd Kurawicz
1978: Dariusz Juzyszyn
1979: Andrzej Bejrowski
1980: Stanisław Wołodko
1981: Stanisław Wołodko
1982: Dariusz Juzyszyn
1983: Dariusz Juzyszyn
1984: Stanisław Grabowski
1985: Dariusz Juzyszyn
1986: Dariusz Juzyszyn
1987: Dariusz Juzyszyn
1988: Dariusz Juzyszyn
1989: Dariusz Juzyszyn
1990: Jacek Strychalski
1991: Jacek Strychalski
1992: Marek Majkrzak
1993: Marek Stolarczyk
1994: Marek Majkrzak
1995: Dariusz Juzyszyn
1996: Andrzej Krawczyk
1997: Andrzej Krawczyk
1998: Andrzej Krawczyk
1999: Olgierd Stański
2000: Olgierd Stański
2001: Olgierd Stański
2002: Andrzej Krawczyk
2003: Andrzej Krawczyk
2004: Andrzej Krawczyk
2005: Piotr Małachowski
2006: Piotr Małachowski

Hammer throw
1960: Olgierd Ciepły
1961: Tadeusz Rut
1962: Olgierd Ciepły
1963: Olgierd Ciepły
1964: Tadeusz Rut
1965: Tadeusz Rut
1966: Tadeusz Rut
1967: Zdzisław Smoliński
1968: Zbigniew Pałyszko
1969: Stanisław Lubiejewski
1970: Piotr Gaździk
1971: Zbigniew Pałyszko
1972: Stanisław Lubiejewski
1973: Stanisław Lubiejewski
1974: Szymon Jagliński
1975: Szymon Jagliński
1976: Szymon Jagliński
1977: Stanisław Lubiejewski
1978: Ireneusz Golda
1979: Ireneusz Golda
1980: Leszek Woderski
1981: Mariusz Tomaszewski
1982: Ireneusz Golda
1983: Zdzisław Kwaśny
1984: Mariusz Tomaszewski
1985: Mariusz Tomaszewski
1986: Wacław Filek
1987: Mariusz Tomaszewski
1988: Mariusz Tomaszewski
1989: 
1990: Stanisław Kapusta
1991: 
1992: Lech Kowalski
1993: Lech Kowalski
1994: Lech Kowalski
1995: Lech Kowalski
1996: Szymon Ziółkowski
1997: Szymon Ziółkowski
1998: Maciej Pałyszko
1999: Szymon Ziółkowski
2000: Szymon Ziółkowski
2001: Szymon Ziółkowski
2002: Szymon Ziółkowski
2003: Wojciech Kondratowicz
2004: Szymon Ziółkowski
2005: Szymon Ziółkowski
2006: Szymon Ziółkowski

Javelin throw
1960: Janusz Sidło
1961: Janusz Sidło
1962: Władysław Nikiciuk
1963: Janusz Sidło
1964: Władysław Nikiciuk
1965: Józef Glogowski
1966: Janusz Sidło
1967: Władysław Nikiciuk
1968: Władysław Nikiciuk
1969: Janusz Sidło
1970: Władysław Nikiciuk
1971: Władysław Nikiciuk
1972: Wiesław Sierański
1973: Władysław Nikiciuk
1974: Bernard Werner
1975: Piotr Bielczyk
1976: Piotr Bielczyk
1977: Piotr Bielczyk
1978: Roman Zwierzchowski
1979: Piotr Bielczyk
1980: Dariusz Adamus
1981: Michał Wacławik
1982: Michał Wacławik
1983: Dariusz Adamus
1984: Stanisław Witek
1985: Mirosław Szybowski
1986: Stanisław Górak
1987: Mirosław Witek
1988: Mirosław Witek
1989: Stanisław Witek
1990: Stanisław Witek
1991: Czesław Uhl
1992: Rajmund Kólko
1993: Tomasz Damszel
1994: Mirosław Witek
1995: Rajmund Kólko
1996: Dariusz Trafas
1997: Rajmund Kólko
1998: Dariusz Trafas
1999: Dariusz Trafas
2000: Grzegorz Krasiński
2001: Dariusz Trafas
2002: Dariusz Trafas
2003: Dariusz Trafas
2004: Rajmund Kólko
2005: Dariusz Trafas
2006: Dariusz Trafas

Decathlon
1960: Andrzej Mankiewicz
1961: Andrzej Mankiewicz
1962: Andrzej Mankiewicz
1963: Jerzy Detko
1964: Tadeusz Grzegorzewski
1965: Jerzy Detko
1966: Jerzy Detko
1967: Tadeusz Grzegorzewski
1968: Jerzy Detko
1969: Tadeusz Janczenko
1970: Tadeusz Janczenko
1971: Tadeusz Janczenko
1972: Tadeusz Janczenko
1973: Ryszard Skowronek
1974: Ryszard Katus
1975: Ryszard Katus
1976: Ryszard Skowronek
1977: Ryszard Skowronek
1978: Ryszard Katus
1979: Dariusz Ludwig
1980: Janusz Szczerkowski
1981: Marek Kubiszewski
1982: Wojciech Podsiadło
1983: Maciej Jedral
1984: Wojciech Podsiadło
1985: Marek Kubiszewski
1986: Janusz Leśniewicz
1987: Wojciech Podsiadło
1988: Dariusz Grad
1989: Dariusz Grad
1990: Andrzej Wyżykowski
1991: 
1992: Michał Krukowski
1993: Grzegorz Stromiński
1994: Sebastian Chmara
1995: Grzegorz Stromiński
1996: Maciej Chmara
1997: Maciej Chmara
1998: Michał Modelski
1999: Michał Modelski
2000: Michał Modelski
2001: Michał Modelski
2002: Krzysztof Andrzejak
2003: Krzysztof Andrzejak
2004: Michał Modelski
2005: Łukasz Płaczek
2006: Łukasz Płaczek

20 kilometres walk
The 1968 and 1983 races were held over short courses, but the champions remained valid.
1960: Franciszek Szyszka
1961: Franciszek Szyszka
1962: Franciszek Szyszka
1963: Wiesław Sarnecki
1964: Andrzej Czapliński
1965: Andrzej Czapliński
1966: Edmund Paziewski
1967: Andrzej Czapliński
1968: Edmund Paziewski
1969: Edmund Paziewski
1970: Andrzej Czapliński
1971: Jan Ornoch
1972: Jan Ornoch
1973: Jan Ornoch
1974: Jan Ornoch
1975: 
1976: Bohdan Bułakowski
1977: Jan Ornoch
1978: Jan Ornoch
1979: Bohdan Bułakowski
1980: Bohdan Bułakowski
1981: Bohdan Bułakowski
1982: Stanisław Rola
1983: Bogusław Duda
1984: Jan Klos
1985: Jan Klos
1986: Grzegorz Ledzion
1987: Jan Klos
1988: Zdzisław Szlapkin
1989: Zbigniew Sadlej
1990: Robert Korzeniowski
1991: Robert Korzeniowski
1992: Robert Korzeniowski
1993: Robert Korzeniowski
1994: Robert Korzeniowski
1995: Robert Korzeniowski
1996: Robert Korzeniowski
1997: Robert Korzeniowski
1998: Robert Korzeniowski
1999: Robert Korzeniowski
2000: Robert Korzeniowski
2001: Robert Korzeniowski
2002: Robert Korzeniowski
2003: Robert Korzeniowski
2004: Robert Korzeniowski
2005: Benjamin Kuciński
2006: Benjamin Kuciński

50 kilometres walk
1972: Bogusław Kmiecik
1973: Bogusław Kmiecik
1974: Stanisław Korneluk
1975: Bogusław Kmiecik
1976: Bogusław Kmiecik
1977: Bogusław Kmiecik
1978: Jan Ornoch
1979: Bogusław Duda
1980: Feliks Śliwiński
1981: Krzysztof Drajski
1982: Bogusław Duda
1983: Bohdan Bułakowski
1984: Jan Klos
1985: Bohdan Bułakowski
1986: Grzegorz Ledzion
1987: Grzegorz Ledzion
1988: Jerzy Wróblewicz
1989: Jacek Bednarek
1990: Grzegorz Adam Urbanowski
1991: Jan Klos
1992: Tomasz Lipiec
1993: Robert Korzeniowski
1994: Sławomir Cielica
1995: Jan Holender
1996: Tomasz Lipiec
1997: Waldemar Dudek
1998: Roman Magdziarczyk
1999: Tomasz Lipiec
2000: Jan Holender
2001: Not held
2002: Grzegorz Sudoł
2003: Rafał Fedaczyński
2004: Kamil Kalka
2005: Kamil Kalka

Women

100 metres
1960: Teresa Ciepły
1961: Teresa Ciepły
1962: Teresa Ciepły
1963: Elżbieta Szyroka
1964: Halina Górecka
1965: Elżbieta Kolejwa
1966: Irena Szewińska
1967: Irena Szewińska
1968: Irena Szewińska
1969: Danuta Jędrejek
1970: Helena Fliśnik
1971: Helena Fliśnik
1972: Irena Szewińska
1973: Irena Szewińska
1974: Irena Szewińska
1975: Ewa Długołęcka
1976: Małgorzata Bogucka
1977: Małgorzata Bogucka
1978: Grażyna Rabsztyn
1979: Irena Szewińska
1980: Zofia Bielczyk
1981: Iwona Pakuła
1982: Iwona Pakuła
1983: Anna Ślipiko
1984: Elżbieta Tomczak
1985: Elżbieta Tomczak
1986: Ewa Kasprzyk
1987: Jolanta Janota
1988: Ewa Pisiewicz
1989: Joanna Smolarek
1990: Joanna Smolarek
1991: Joanna Smolarek
1992: Joanna Smolarek
1993: Dorota Krawczak
1994: Izabela Czajko
1995: Kinga Leszczyńska
1996: Kinga Leszczyńska
1997: Anna Leszczyńska
1998: Kinga Leszczyńska
1999: Zuzanna Radecka
2000: Zuzanna Radecka
2001: Agnieszka Rysiukiewicz
2002: Beata Szkudlarz
2003: Daria Korczyńska
2004: Daria Korczyńska
2005: Daria Korczyńska
2006: Daria Korczyńska

200 metres
1960: Barbara Sobotta
1961: Barbara Sobotta
1962: Barbara Sobotta
1963: Barbara Sobotta
1964: Halina Górecka
1965: Elżbieta Kolejwa
1966: Irena Szewińska
1967: Mirosława Salacińska
1968: Irena Szewińska
1969: Mirosława Sarna
1970: Urszula Jóźwik
1971: Irena Szewińska
1972: Irena Szewińska
1973: Irena Szewińska
1974: Irena Szewińska
1975: Irena Szewińska
1976: Małgorzata Bogucka
1977: Małgorzata Bogucka
1978: Małgorzata Gajewska
1979: Irena Szewińska
1980: Zofia Bielczyk
1981: Agnieszka Siwek
1982: Iwona Pakuła
1983: Ewa Kasprzyk
1984: Ewa Kasprzyk
1985: Ewa Kasprzyk
1986: Ewa Kasprzyk
1987: Ewa Kasprzyk
1988: Agnieszka Siwek
1989: Ewa Kasprzyk
1990: Joanna Smolarek
1991: Joanna Smolarek
1992: Sylwia Pachut
1993: Izabela Czajko
1994: Izabela Czajko
1995: Kinga Leszczyńska
1996: Kinga Leszczyńska
1997: Kinga Leszczyńska
1998: Kinga Leszczyńska
1999: Zuzanna Radecka
2000: Zuzanna Radecka
2001: Joanna Niełacna
2002: Grażyna Prokopek
2003: Anna Guzowska
2004: Grażyna Prokopek
2005: Anna Guzowska
2006: Monika Bejnar

400 metres
1960: Janina Hase
1961: Karolina Łukaszczyk
1962: Janina Hase
1963: Janina Hase
1964: Celina Jesionowska
1965: Celina Jesionowska
1966: Celina Jesionowska
1967: Czesława Nowak
1968: Czesława Nowak
1969: Elżbieta Katolik
1970: Czesława Nowak
1971: Krystyna Kacperczyk
1972: 
1973: Krystyna Kacperczyk
1974: Krystyna Kacperczyk
1975: Danuta Piecyk
1976: Genowefa Błaszak
1977: Krystyna Kacperczyk
1978: Irena Szewińska
1979: Grażyna Oliszewska
1980: Małgorzata Dunecka
1981: Grażyna Oliszewska
1982: Genowefa Błaszak
1983: Elżbieta Kapusta
1984: Genowefa Błaszak
1985: Małgorzata Dunecka
1986: Marzena Wojdecka
1987: Genowefa Błaszak
1988: Genowefa Błaszak
1989: Elżbieta Kilińska
1990: Renata Sosin
1991: Elżbieta Kilińska
1992: Elżbieta Kilińska
1993: Elżbieta Kilińska
1994: Elżbieta Kilińska
1995: Barbara Grzywocz
1996: Sylwia Kwilińska
1997: Inga Tarnawska
1998: Grażyna Prokopek
1999: Grażyna Prokopek
2000: Grażyna Prokopek
2001: Grażyna Prokopek
2002: Grażyna Prokopek
2003: Monika Bejnar
2004: Monika Bejnar
2005: Anna Guzowska
2006: Anna Jesień

800 metres
1960: Krystyna Nowakowska
1961: Zofia Walasek
1962: Krystyna Nowakowska
1963: Henryka Jóźwik
1964: Danuta Sobieska
1965: Danuta Sobieska
1966: Danuta Sobieska
1967: Danuta Sobieska
1968: Zofia Kołakowska
1969: Zofia Kołakowska
1970: Danuta Wierzbowska
1971: Elżbieta Katolik
1972: Danuta Wierzbowska
1973: Danuta Wierzbowska
1974: Jolanta Januchta
1975: Elżbieta Katolik
1976: Elżbieta Katolik
1977: Jolanta Januchta
1978: Jolanta Januchta
1979: Jolanta Januchta
1980: Jolanta Januchta
1981: Anna Rybicka
1982: Wanda Stefańska
1983: Jolanta Januchta
1984: Brygida Bąk
1985: Wanda Wójtowiec
1986: Grażyna Kowina
1987: Wanda Wójtowiec
1988: Małgorzata Rydz
1989: Dorota Buczkowska
1990: Joanna Siemieniuk
1991: Małgorzata Rydz
1992: Małgorzata Rydz
1993: Małgorzata Rydz
1994: Anna Jakubczak
1995: Małgorzata Rydz
1996: Lidia Chojecka
1997: Anna Jakubczak
1998: Aleksandra Dereń
1999: Anna Jakubczak
2000: Anna Rostkowska
2001: Anna Rostkowska
2002: Anna Rostkowska
2003: Anna Rostkowska
2004: Anna Rostkowska
2005: Ewelina Sętowska-Dryk
2006: Aneta Lemiesz

1500 metres
1969: Zofia Kołakowska
1970: Danuta Wierzbowska
1971: Danuta Wierzbowska
1972: 
1973: Bronisława Ludwichowska
1974: Czesława Surdel
1975: Bronisława Ludwichowska
1976: Bronisława Ludwichowska
1977: Celina Sokołowska
1978: Jolanta Januchta
1979: Celina Sokołowska
1980: Anna Bukis
1981: Stanisława Fedyk
1982: Maria Bąk
1983: Jolanta Januchta
1984: Danuta Piotrowska
1985: Barbara Klepka
1986: Barbara Klepka
1987: Anna Rybicka
1988: Małgorzata Rydz
1989: Małgorzata Rydz
1990: Małgorzata Rydz
1991: Małgorzata Rydz
1992: Małgorzata Rydz
1993: Małgorzata Rydz
1994: Małgorzata Rydz
1995: Małgorzata Rydz
1996: Małgorzata Rydz
1997: Małgorzata Rydz
1998: Anna Jakubczak
1999: Lidia Chojecka
2000: Lidia Chojecka
2001: Justyna Bąk
2002: Lidia Chojecka
2003: Justyna Lesman
2004: Anna Jakubczak
2005: Wioletta Frankiewicz
2006: Sylwia Ejdys

3000 metres
1973: Bronisława Ludwichowska
1974: Urzsula Prasek
1975: Bronisława Ludwichowska
1976: Renata Walendziak
1977: Celina Sokołowska
1978: Celina Sokołowska
1979: Celina Sokołowska
1980: Ewa Szydłowska
1981: Stanisława Fedyk
1982: Maria Bąk
1983: Maria Bąk
1984: Wanda Panfil
1985: Renata Kokowska
1986: Renata Kokowska
1987: Wanda Panfil
1988: Grażyna Kowina
1989: Bożena Dziubińska
1990: Grażyna Kowina
1991: Grażyna Kowina
1992: Aniela Nikiel
1993: Anna Brzezińska
1994: Aniela Nikiel

5000 metres
1984: Renata Kokowska
1985: Wanda Panfil
1986: Renata Kokowska
1987: Wanda Panfil
1988: Wanda Panfil
1989: Wanda Panfil
1990: Grażyna Kowina
1991: Not held
1992: Not held
1993: Not held
1994: Not held
1995: Dorota Gruca
1996: Danuta Marczyk
1997: Justyna Bąk
1998: Dorota Gruca
1999: Dorota Gruca
2000: Justyna Bąk
2001: Justyna Bąk
2002: Wioletta Frankiewicz
2003: Grażyna Syrek
2004: Wioletta Frankiewicz
2005: Justyna Bąk
2006: Grażyna Syrek

10,000 metres
1984: Renata Kokowska
1985: Renata Kokowska
1986: Renata Kokowska
1987: Renata Kokowska
1988: Renata Kokowska
1989: Lidia Camberg
1990: Anna Rybicka
1991: Irena Czuta
1992: Anna Rybicka
1993: Anna Rybicka
1994: Aniela Nikiel
1995: Dorota Gruca
1996: Dorota Gruca
1997: Renata Sobiesiak
1998: Dorota Gruca
1999: Dorota Gruca
2000: Justyna Bąk
2001: Dorota Gruca
2002: Marzena Michalska
2003: Patrycja Włodarczyk
2004: Dorota Gruca
2005: Grażyna Syrek
2006: Grażyna Syrek

20K run
1984: Gabriela Górzyńska
1985: Gabriela Górzyńska
1986: Anna Iskra
1987: Anna Busko
1988: Wanda Panfil
1989: Gabriela Górzyńska
1990: Anna Rybicka
1991: Izabela Zatorska

Half marathon
1992: Kamila Gradus
1993: Czesława Mentlewicz
1994: Izabela Zatorska
1995: Aniela Nikiel
1996: Dorota Gruca
1997: Renata Sobiesiak
1998: Elżbieta Jarosz
1999: Małgorzata Sobańska
2000: Dorota Gruca
2001: Dorota Gruca
2002: Monika Stefanowicz
2003: Dorota Gruca
2004: Małgorzata Sobańska
2005: Grażyna Syrek

Marathon
The 1992 marathon race was held on a short course, but the champion remained valid.
1982: Anna Bełtowska
1983: Renata Walendziak
1984: Gabriela Górzyńska
1985: Renata Walendziak
1986: Renata Walendziak
1987: Ewa Szydłowska
1988: Wanda Panfil
1989: Krystyna Chylińska
1990: Krystyna Kuta
1991: Ewa Olas
1992: Ewa Olas
1993: Wioletta Uryga
1994: Aniela Nikiel
1995: Wioletta Uryga
1996: Joanna Chmiel
1997: Aniela Nikiel
1998: Małgorzata Birbach
1999: Wioletta Kryza
2000: Janina Malska
2001: Elżbieta Jarosz
2002: Grażyna Syrek
2003: Grażyna Syrek
2004: Monika Stefanowicz
2005: Janina Malska

3000 metres steeplechase
1999: Justyna Bąk
2000: Małgorzata Jamróz
2001: Patrycja Włodarczyk
2002: Julia Budniak
2003: Patrycja Włodarczyk
2004: Justyna Bąk
2005: Katarzyna Kowalska
2006: Wioletta Frankiewicz

80 metres hurdles
1960: Barbara Sosgórnik
1961: Teresa Ciepły
1962: Teresa Ciepły
1963: Maria Piątkowska
1964: Teresa Ciepły
1965: Teresa Ciepły
1966: Elżbieta Żebrowska
1967: Teresa Nowak
1968: Teresa Sukniewicz

100 metres hurdles
1969: Teresa Nowak
1970: Teresa Sukniewicz
1971: Danuta Straszyńska
1972: Danuta Straszyńska
1973: Grażyna Rabsztyn
1974: Teresa Nowak
1975: Grażyna Rabsztyn
1976: Grażyna Rabsztyn
1977: Bożena Nowakowska
1978: Grażyna Rabsztyn
1979: Grażyna Rabsztyn
1980: Grażyna Rabsztyn
1981: Elżbieta Rabsztyn
1982: Lucyna Langer
1983: Lucyna Langer
1984: Lucyna Langer
1985: Sylwia Bednarska
1986: Małgorzata Guzowska
1987: Barbara Latos
1988: Grażyna Tadrzak
1989: Maria Kamrowska
1990: Maria Kamrowska
1991: Urszula Włodarczyk
1992: Aldona Fogiel
1993: Maria Kamrowska
1994: Maria Kamrowska
1995: Aldona Fogiel
1996: Aldona Fogiel
1997: Anna Leszczyńska
1998: Anna Leszczyńska
1999: Anna Leszczyńska
2000: Aneta Sosnowska
2001: Aneta Sosnowska
2002: Aurelia Trywiańska
2003: Aurelia Trywiańska
2004: Aurelia Trywiańska
2005: Aurelia Trywiańska
2006: Aurelia Trywiańska

200 metres hurdles
1970: Teresa Sukniewicz
1971: Danuta Straszyńska

400 metres hurdles
1973: Danuta Piecyk
1974: Danuta Piecyk
1975: Danuta Piecyk
1976: Genowefa Błaszak
1977: Elżbieta Katolik
1978: Krystyna Kacperczyk
1979: Elżbieta Katolik
1980: Barbara Kwietniewska
1981: Genowefa Błaszak
1982: Anna Maniecka
1983: Genowefa Błaszak
1984: Jolanta Stalmach
1985: Genowefa Błaszak
1986: Genowefa Błaszak
1987: Małgorzata Dunecka
1988: Genowefa Błaszak
1989: Beata Knapczyk
1990: Agata Sadurska
1991: Monika Warnicka
1992: Monika Warnicka
1993: Sylwia Pachut
1994: Monika Warnicka
1995: Monika Warnicka
1996: Monika Warnicka
1997: Monika Warnicka
1998: Małgorzata Pskit
1999: Anna Jesień
2000: Anna Jesień
2001: Małgorzata Pskit
2002: Anna Jesień
2003: Anna Jesień
2004: Małgorzata Pskit
2005: Anna Jesień
2006: Marta Chrust-Rożej

High jump
1960: Jarosława Jóźwiakowska
1961: Jarosława Jóźwiakowska
1962: Jarosława Jóźwiakowska
1963: Iwona Ronczewska
1964: Jarosława Jóźwiakowska
1965: Jarosława Jóźwiakowska
1966: Jarosława Jóźwiakowska
1967: Maria Zielińska
1968: Danuta Berezowska-Prociów
1969: Danuta Berezowska-Prociów
1970: Danuta Hołowińska
1971: Danuta Berezowska-Prociów
1972: Danuta Hołowińska
1973: Anna Bubala
1974: 
1975: Anna Pstuś
1976: Eugenia Więcek
1977: Danuta Bułkowska
1978: Urszula Kielan
1979: Elżbieta Trylińska
1980: Urszula Kielan
1981: Elżbieta Trylińska
1982: Danuta Bułkowska
1983: Danuta Bułkowska
1984: Danuta Bułkowska
1985: Danuta Bułkowska
1986: Danuta Bułkowska
1987: Danuta Bułkowska
1988: Danuta Bułkowska
1989: Danuta Bułkowska
1990: Beata Hołub
1991: Beata Hołub
1992: Beata Hołub
1993: Beata Hołub
1994: Iwona Kielan
1995: Donata Jancewicz
1996: Donata Jancewicz
1997: Agnieszka Giedrojć
1998: Donata Jancewicz
1999: Donata Jancewicz
2000: Donata Jancewicz
2001: Anna Ksok
2002: Agnieszka Falasa
2003: Anna Ksok
2004: Anna Ksok
2005: Anna Ksok
2006: Karolina Gronau

Pole vault
1995: Anna Skrzyńska
1996: Anna Wielgus
1997: Anna Wielgus
1998: Anna Wielgus
1999: Monika Pyrek
2000: Monika Pyrek
2001: Monika Pyrek
2002: Monika Pyrek
2003: Agnieszka Wrona
2004: Monika Pyrek
2005: Monika Pyrek
2006: Monika Pyrek

Long jump
1960: Maria Kusion-Bibro
1961: Maria Kusion-Bibro
1962: Elżbieta Krzesińska
1963: Elżbieta Krzesińska
1964: Mirosława Sarna
1965: Irena Szewińska
1966: Ryszarda Warzocha
1967: Irena Szewińska
1968: Mirosława Sarna
1969: Mirosława Sarna
1970: Helena Fliśnik
1971: Irena Szewińska
1972: 
1973: Mirosława Sarna
1974: Maria Zukowska
1975: Maria Długosielska
1976: Ewa Garczyńska
1977: Barbara Sochaczewska
1978: Teresa Marciniak
1979: Anna Włodarczyk
1980: Barbara Baran-Wojnar
1981: Anna Włodarczyk
1982: Teresa Lewicka
1983: Elżbieta Klimaszewska
1984: Anna Włodarczyk
1985: Agata Karczmarek
1986: Agata Karczmarek
1987: Agata Karczmarek
1988: Agata Karczmarek
1989: Agata Karczmarek
1990: Renata Nielsen
1991: Agata Karczmarek
1992: Agata Karczmarek
1993: Agata Karczmarek
1994: Agata Karczmarek
1995: Agata Karczmarek
1996: Agata Karczmarek
1997: Agata Karczmarek
1998: Dorota Brodowska
1999: Agata Karczmarek
2000: Agata Karczmarek
2001: Liliana Zagacka
2002: Liliana Zagacka
2003: Liliana Zagacka
2004: Liliana Zagacka
2005: Małgorzata Trybańska-Strońska
2006: Małgorzata Trybańska-Strońska

Triple jump
1991: Urszula Włodarczyk
1992: Urszula Włodarczyk
1993: Agnieszka Stańczyk
1994: Urszula Włodarczyk
1995: Ilona Pazoła
1996: Ilona Pazoła
1997: Aneta Sadach
1998: Ilona Pazoła
1999: Ilona Pazoła
2000: Liliana Zagacka
2001: Liliana Zagacka
2002: Liliana Zagacka
2003: Liliana Zagacka
2004: Liliana Zagacka
2005: Aleksandra Fila
2006: Aneta Sadach

Shot put
1960: Eugenia Rusin
1961: Jadwiga Klimaj
1962: Stefania Kiewłeń
1963: Jadwiga Klimaj
1964: Stefania Kiewłeń
1965: Eugenia Rusin
1966: Eugenia Rusin
1967: Eugenia Rusin
1968: Elżbieta Michalczak
1969: Elżbieta Michalczak
1970: Ludwika Chewińska
1971: Ludwika Chewińska
1972: Ludwika Chewińska
1973: Ludwika Chewińska
1974: Ludwika Chewińska
1975: Ludwika Chewińska
1976: Ludwika Chewińska
1977: Beata Habrzyk
1978: Beata Habrzyk
1979: Beata Habrzyk
1980: Ludwika Chewińska
1981: Ludwika Chewińska
1982: Ludwika Chewińska
1983: Ludwika Chewińska
1984: Bogumiła Suska
1985: Małgorzata Wolska
1986: Małgorzata Wolska
1987: Małgorzata Wolska
1988: Małgorzata Wolska
1989: Mirosława Znojek
1990: Małgorzata Wolska
1991: Krystyna Zabawska
1992: Krystyna Zabawska
1993: Krystyna Zabawska
1994: Krystyna Zabawska
1995: Katarzyna Żakowicz
1996: Krystyna Zabawska
1997: Krystyna Zabawska
1998: Krystyna Zabawska
1999: Krystyna Zabawska
2000: Krystyna Zabawska
2001: Krystyna Zabawska
2002: Krystyna Zabawska
2003: Krystyna Zabawska
2004: Krystyna Zabawska
2005: Magdalena Sobieszek
2006: Krystyna Zabawska

Discus throw
1960: Helena Dmowska
1961: Kazimiera Rykowska
1962: Kazimiera Rykowska
1963: Kazimiera Rykowska
1964: Kazimiera Rykowska
1965: Kazimiera Rykowska
1966: Kazimiera Rykowska
1967: Jadwiga Wójtczak
1968: Jadwiga Wójtczak
1969: Jadwiga Wójtczak
1970: Jadwiga Wójtczak
1971: Krystyna Nadolna
1972: Krystyna Nadolna
1973: Krystyna Nadolna
1974: Danuta Rosani
1975: 
1976: Danuta Rosani
1977: Krystyna Nadolna
1978: Danuta Rosani
1979: Danuta Majewska
1980: Danuta Majewska
1981: Danuta Majewska
1982: Ewa Siepsiak
1983: Danuta Majewska
1984: Ewa Siepsiak
1985: Renata Katewicz
1986: Renata Katewicz
1987: Renata Katewicz
1988: Renata Katewicz
1989: Ewa Siepsiak
1990: Anna Zaczek
1991: Paulina Gugniewicz
1992: Renata Katewicz
1993: Marzena Wysocka
1994: Marzena Wysocka
1995: Joanna Wiśniewska
1996: Renata Katewicz
1997: Renata Katewicz
1998: Marzena Zbrojewska
1999: Joanna Wiśniewska
2000: Joanna Wiśniewska
2001: Marzena Wysocka
2002: Joanna Wiśniewska
2003: Marzena Wysocka
2004: Wioletta Potępa
2005: Marzena Wysocka
2006: Wioletta Potępa

Hammer throw
1995: Elżbieta Wolnik
1996: Kamila Skolimowska
1997: Kamila Skolimowska
1998: Jolanta Borawska
1999: Kamila Skolimowska
2000: Kamila Skolimowska
2001: Kamila Skolimowska
2002: Kamila Skolimowska
2003: Kamila Skolimowska
2004: Kamila Skolimowska
2005: Kamila Skolimowska
2006: Kamila Skolimowska

Javelin throw
1960: Urszula Figwer
1961: Teresa Tubek
1962: Ksawera Grochal
1963: Ksawera Grochal
1964: Daniela Jaworska
1965: Lucyna Krawcewicz
1966: Daniela Jaworska
1967: Daniela Jaworska
1968: Daniela Jaworska
1969: Daniela Jaworska
1970: Daniela Jaworska
1971: Daniela Jaworska
1972: Ewa Gryziecka
1973: Daniela Jaworska
1974: 
1975: Ewa Gryziecka
1976: Daniela Jaworska
1977: Bernadetta Blechacz
1978: Bernadetta Blechacz
1979: Bernadetta Blechacz
1980: Bernadetta Blechacz
1981: Bernadetta Blechacz
1982: Genowefa Patla
1983: Genowefa Patla
1984: Genowefa Patla
1985: Genowefa Patla
1986: Genowefa Patla
1987: Małgorzata Kiełczewska
1988: Genowefa Patla
1989: Mariola Dankiewicz
1990: Genowefa Patla
1991: Genowefa Patla
1992: Genowefa Patla
1993: Genowefa Patla
1994: Genowefa Patla
1995: Genowefa Patla
1996: Ewa Rybak
1997: Ewa Rybak
1998: Ewa Rybak
1999: Genowefa Patla
2000: Genowefa Patla
2001: Monika Mrówka
2002: Ewa Rybak
2003: Barbara Madejczyk
2004: Barbara Madejczyk
2005: Barbara Madejczyk
2006: Barbara Madejczyk

Pentathlon
1960: Barbara Sosgórnik
1961: Maria Kusion-Bibro
1962: Elżbieta Krzesińska
1963: Apolonia Winiarska
1964: Halina Krzyzańska
1965: Łucja Noworyta
1966: Mirosława Sarna
1967: Bożena Woźniak
1968: Małgorzata Majchrzak
1969: Lucyna Koczwara
1970: Ryszarda Rurka
1971: Barbara Waśniewska
1972: Bożena Kania
1973: Małgorzata Majchrzak
1974: 
1975: 
1976: Grażyna Niestój
1977: Grażyna Niestój
1978: Danuta Cały
1979: Danuta Cały

Heptathlon
1980: Małgorzata Guzowska
1981: Małgorzata Guzowska
1982: Małgorzata Guzowska
1983: Małgorzata Guzowska
1984: Małgorzata Guzowska
1985: Lidia Bierka
1986: Lidia Bierka
1987: Małgorzata Lisowska
1988: Urszula Włodarczyk
1989: Lidia Frank
1990: Urszula Włodarczyk
1991: Urszula Włodarczyk
1992: Urszula Włodarczyk
1993: Urszula Włodarczyk
1994: Elżbieta Rączka
1995: Bożena Bogucka
1996: Urszula Włodarczyk
1997: Urszula Włodarczyk
1998: Elżbieta Rączka
1999: Elżbieta Rączka
2000: Elżbieta Rączka
2001: Izabella Obłękowska
2002: Magdalena Szczepańska
2003: Magdalena Szczepańska
2004: Magdalena Szczepańska
2005: Magdalena Szczepańska
2006: Karolina Tymińska

5000 metres walk
1981: Agnieszka Wyszyńska
1982: Agnieszka Wyszyńska
1983: Agnieszka Wyszyńska
1984: Beata Bączyk
1985: Kazimiera Mróz
1986: Zofia Wolan
1987: Zofia Wolan
1988: Kazimiera Mosio
1989: Kazimiera Mosio
1990: Katarzyna Radtke
1991: Katarzyna Radtke
1992: Katarzyna Radtke
1993: Katarzyna Radtke
1994: Katarzyna Radtke
1995: Katarzyna Radtke
1996: Bożena Górecka

10 kilometres walk
The 1989 race was held on a track.
1981: Agnieszka Wyszyńska
1982: Agnieszka Wyszyńska
1983: Agnieszka Wyszyńska
1984: Beata Bączyk
1985: Ewa Musur
1986: Renata Rogoz
1987: Zofia Wolan
1988: Ewa Musur
1989: Kazimiera Mosio
1990: Jolanta Frysztak
1991: Katarzyna Radtke
1992: Katarzyna Radtke
1993: Katarzyna Radtke
1994: Katarzyna Radtke
1995: Katarzyna Radtke
1996: Katarzyna Radtke
1997: Agnieszka Andula
1998: Katarzyna Radtke
1999: Katarzyna Radtke
2000: Katarzyna Radtke
2001: Joanna Baj

20 kilometres walk
1998: Katarzyna Radtke
1999: Katarzyna Radtke
2000: Sylwia Korzeniowska
2001: Joanna Baj
2002: Sylwia Korzeniowska
2003: Sylwia Korzeniowska
2004: Sylwia Korzeniowska
2005: Agnieszka Olesz
2006: Agnieszka Olesz

References

Champions 1960–2006
Polish Championships. GBR Athletics. Retrieved 2021-01-29.

Winners
 List
Polish Championships
Athletics